The Detroit Newspaper Strike was a major labor dispute which began in Detroit, Michigan on July 13, 1995, and involved several actions including a local boycott, corporate campaign, and legal charges of unfair labor practices. The primary action involved around 2,500 members of six labor unions going on strike from July 13, 1995, to February 14, 1997. The unions ended their strike on February 14, 1997, and it was resolved in court three years later, with the journalists' union losing its unfair labor practices case on appeal.

Background
Tension between the unions and management of Detroit's primary two newspapers had been building for several years. Management attempted to force out the unions by attempting to switch from employee distribution to independent contractors. The unions claimed management was engaging in unfair labor practices. Chris Rhomberg, a sociology professor at Fordham University, concludes in his book, The Broken Table, that management provoked the strike and had been preparing for several years. Revolutionary Worker claimed that the owners had been planning as early as 1989 to significantly change the existing labor agreements with the unions. They cite the 1989 "Joint Operating Agreement" (JOA), which combined the non-editorial operations of the newspapers, as one example of those efforts. The agreement resulted in a 29% reduction in the workforce.

The strike
On July 13, 1995, about 2,500 members of six different unions went on strike after management indicated it would not discuss recent labor practice changes by Detroit News publisher, Robert Giles. The unions included The Newspaper Guild and the Teamsters, along with the pressmen, printers and Teamsters working for the "Detroit Newspapers" distribution arm.

The newspapers continued to publish during the strike, and aired commercials depicting "People Behind the Paper". The strikers published a competing weekly newspaper, the Detroit Sunday Journal. By October, about 40% of the editorial staffers had crossed the picket line, and many trickled back over the next months, including Mitch Albom - who wrote a column urging an end to the strike, while others stayed during the duration of the strike.

Striking workers traveled the United States to draw attention to the conflict and pressure corporate boards of directors of advertisers in the two newspapers. In Winter 1996, twenty-seven strikers were arrested for blocking Gannett Company's Port Huron, Michigan printing facility for the USA Today regional edition. The company switched printing of that edition to a more secure facility in Toledo, Ohio. In September 1996, columnist and strike supporter, Susan Watson, was terminated from the Detroit Free Press for participating in a sitdown strike at the Detroit Free Press Building.

The unions ended their strike on February 14, 1997. The strike was costly for the labor unions, such as the Teamsters paying about  toward legal fees and strike benefits.

Resolution and aftermath
Following the strike, management indicated they would not fire any of the replacement workers, and would only hire strikers as positions became available. By April 1997, only 200 of the 2,000 striking workers had been rehired.

The National Labor Relations Board ruled in 1997 that the newspapers had engaged in unfair labor practices. But the newspapers appealed, and the federal courts reversed the NLRB ruling in 2000.

The unions remain active at the papers, representing a majority of the employees under their jurisdiction.

Ten years after the strike, the newspapers had still not recovered the lost circulation from the strike.

References

External links
The Detroit Sunday Journal at Wayne State University Library contains the full run of the Detroit Sunday Journal, which was published by the striking union workers for the duration of the strike, in a digitized, searchable format.

1995 labor disputes and strikes
1995 in American politics
1995 in Michigan
1996 labor disputes and strikes
1996 in American politics
1996 in Michigan
1997 labor disputes and strikes
1997 in American politics
1997 in Michigan
Newspaper labor disputes in the United States
Economy of Detroit
1990s in Detroit
Labor disputes in Michigan